The Legal Aid, Sentencing and Punishment of Offenders Act 2012 (LASPO) is a statute of the Parliament of the United Kingdom enacted by the coalition government of 2010-2015, creating reforms to the justice system. The bill for the act was introduced in the House of Commons on 21 June 2011, and received Royal Assent on 1 May 2012.

Measures 

Among other measures, the Act:
 Gives courts greater discretion to issue conditional discharges for young persons pleading guilty to a first offence
The objectives of the Act included making significant savings in the cost of the scheme, discouraging unnecessary and adversarial litigation at public expense, and targeting legal aid to those who need it the most.
 Creates a "single remand framework" for the use of secure remand for children and young people; transfers the cost of remand arrangements to local authorities; creates new conditions that must be met before a child or young person is remanded into custody
 Expands Youth Rehabilitation Orders (YROs) to allow longer curfew hours, single duration extensions of six months; increases the maximum fines for breaches; and allows courts to order a period of supervision instead of custody following a breach
 Abolishes the Legal Services Commission, a non-departmental public body, and replaces it with the Legal Aid Agency, a new executive agency of the Ministry of Justice
 Part 1 of the Act - removes financial support for most cases involving housing, welfare, medical negligence, employment, debt and immigration.
 Part 1 of the Act - removes financial support for most private family law cases, other than in situations involving domestic abuse allegations, where a child who is the subject of the proceedings is at the risk of 'harm' from another party.

In Part 3 of the Act, concerned with sentencing and punishment of offenders:
Chapter 1 brings the sentencing starting point for murders motivated by hate on the grounds of disability or transgender to 30 years, falling into line with other types of hate crime, and removes the maximum fine on certain offences dealt with by Magistrates Courts, including fines for health and safety offences, so that fines may now be unlimited ("a fine of any amount").
Chapter 6 modifies the Crime (Sentences) Act 1997 to allow the Secretary of State to deport foreign nationals serving indeterminate prison sentences, once they have served the minimum term.
Chapter 9 creates a new offence of squatting in a residential building, with a maximum punishment of 51 weeks' imprisonment, a fine not exceeding level 5 of the standard scale (£5,000), or both; and amends the Police and Criminal Evidence Act 1984 to allow the police to enter and search such a building if they suspect someone to be squatting in it

Development 
The creation of a new offence for squatting was proposed by Mike Weatherley, Member of Parliament (MP) for Hove in East Sussex, who had been campaigning against squatting since being elected to Parliament in 2010. In a consultation held in 2011, the government raised the option of criminalising squatting in commercial (non-residential) properties. Following responses to the consultation indicating a lower level of concern over such squatting, it indicated that it had no current plans to extend the definition of the offence.

At the time, polling indicated the public were largely in favour of criminalising squatting, with a YouGov poll finding eight out of ten people agreed with the change.

Crispin Blunt, Parliamentary Under-Secretary of State for Prisons and Youth Justice within the Ministry of Justice at the time, justified the changes to the law, saying:

Effects and criticism

Squatting

Section 144 of LASPO, creating the new offence of squatting in a residential property, came into force on 1 September 2012. A 'residential property' is defined as one "designed or adapted, before the time of entry, for use as a place to live". The first person to be imprisoned for the new offence was Alex Haight, a 21-year-old bricklayer from Plymouth who had come to London looking for work and squatted a council flat. On 27 September 2012 he was sentenced to 12 weeks in prison.

Rules regarding squatting commercial properties remained as layout in Section 6 of the Criminal Law Act 1977.

The act was criticised by the charities Crisis and The Big Issue Foundation as criminalising the homeless, possibly causing a sharp rise in homelessness, and benefitting landlords that leave their buildings empty. Several campaign groups protested the law at locations around the UK in 2011. On 23 February 2013, Daniel Gauntlett, a homeless man, was warned by Kent police not to shelter in a boarded up empty bungalow that was due for demolition. An inquest on 27 February found that his subsequent death sleeping on its doorstep was caused by hypothermia. In March 2012, the campaign group Squatters' Action for Secure Homes (SQUASH) published a report claiming that the cost of implementing the squatting law reforms over the next five years would reach £790m, some five times the official estimate.

In August 2013 Mike Weatherley wrote to the Prime Minister in support of an extension of the law to cover commercial properties,  following 24 MPs putting their signature to an Early Day Motion in January 2013 calling for the law's extension.

Legal aid
In August 2011 the Law Centres Federation and London Legal Support Trust warned that a third of the 56 law centres in the United Kingdom would be forced to close as a result of the cuts to legal aid. Furthermore, 27 legal aid providers have collapsed since April 2020, which is more than 70 officers. In May 2012 the Labour peer Lord Bach, former Parliamentary Under-Secretary of State in the Ministry of Justice and current shadow spokesman on legal aid, condemned the legislation as "a rotten bill [that] demeans our justice system and therefore our country. [It takes] away from the poor their access to justice." Andy Slaughter, the shadow Justice Minister, described the legislation as "cynical" and "cover[ing] up mistakes made". The Ministry of Justice defended the legislation, stating that it would keep legal aid "where legal help is most needed, where people's life or liberty is at stake or they are at risk of serious physical harm, face immediate loss of their home or their children may be taken into care, [while] reducing the £2.1bn per year legal aid bill for England and Wales."

Transitional arrangements for the treatment of existing legal aid cases were established in 2013 by the Legal Aid, Sentencing and Punishment of Offenders Act 2012 (Consequential, Transitional and Saving Provisions) Regulations 2013, which also made consequential amendments to secondary legislation.

LASPO has also affected legal aid providers. In January 2014, thousands of criminal case lawyers across the country participated in a protest, by not participating in cases and staging a number of walkouts, against planned cuts to legal aid. The protest, organised by the Criminal Bar Association, was the first in the history of the criminal bar in the UK. This was largely because criminal legal aid barristers get paid a medial net annual income of £27,000, which is less than the starting salary for a graduate manager at Aldi, who will work less hours than a barrister. There have also been many job losses for lawyers due to a decline in the number of firms offering legal aid. Furthermore, legal aid firms do not profit from money coming in from the Legal Aid Agency, and instead must use the money to pay staff and business costs etc. Some barristers also feel that their role has been "driven to extinction."

This has worsened during the pandemic, as the Law Society of England and Wales has confirmed that there are problems for legal aid providers with working remotely, something the society is pushing for further guidance from the Legal Aid Agency about. The Law Society also believe there should be fairer pay awarded to criminal legal aid providers. LASPO has also meant longer hours and an increase in paperwork for legal aid lawyers, particularly solicitors. The continued problems resulted in yet another protest by barristers in 2022.

Notes

References

Citations

External links 
 Legal Aid, Sentencing and Punishment of Offenders Act 2012 at Ministry of Justice
 Full text of the Legal Aid, Sentencing and Punishment of Offenders Act 2012 at legislation.gov.uk
 Full text of the Legal Aid, Sentencing and Punishment of Offenders Act 2012 (Consequential, Transitional and Saving Provisions) Regulations 2013 at legislation.gov.uk

Acts of the Parliament of the United Kingdom concerning England and Wales
United Kingdom Acts of Parliament 2012
Squatting
Acts of the Parliament of the United Kingdom concerning legal services